South Pasco Island is an island, with an area of 21 ha, in south-eastern Australia.  It is part of Tasmania’s Pasco Island Group, lying in eastern Bass Strait off the north-west coast of Flinders Island in the Furneaux Group.  It is used for grazing sheep.

Fauna
Seabirds and waders recorded as breeding on the island include little penguin, short-tailed shearwater, white-faced storm-petrel, Pacific gull, Caspian tern and sooty oystercatcher.  White's skink is present.

See also

 List of islands of Tasmania

References

Furneaux Group